"Wild Thing" is a song written by American songwriter Chip Taylor and popularized by the English rock band the Troggs. It was originally recorded and released by the American rock band the Wild Ones in 1965, but it did not chart. The Troggs' single reached number one on the Billboard Hot 100 and number two on the UK Singles Chart in 1966. Their version of "Wild Thing" was ranked at number 257 on the Rolling Stone magazine's list of the 500 Greatest Songs of All Time.  It has also been performed by many other musicians.

Background
The first studio version was recorded by the Wild Ones, a band based in New York and set up by socialite Sybil Christopher. They had contacted composer Chip Taylor to ask him to write a song for them to release as a single. Taylor composed it very quickly: within a couple of minutes, he had the chorus and a "sexual-kind-of-feeling song" emerged. 

On his demo version, Taylor banged on a tambourine while producer Ron Johnsen "was doing this little thing with his hands", as Taylor related it. The result sounded "cool". Producer Gerry Granahan approved the song and then produced the Wild Ones' recording, with vocals by Chuck Alden. 

On its release in November 1965, the record failed to sell, and Alden later said that he regretted not performing the song in the same way as Taylor's demo. The solo in the middle of the song was performed by the recording engineer using his hands as a whistle. This sound was subsequently imitated by the Troggs in their version using an ocarina.

The Troggs' version
English rock band the Troggs recorded the song after their manager Larry Page recommended it, recalling later that it was "so weird and unusual that we just had to record it".

Owing to a distribution dispute, the Troggs' single was available on two competing labels: Atco Records and Fontana Records. Because both pressings were taken from the same master recording, Billboard combined the sales for both releases, making it the only single to simultaneously reach number one for two companies.

On 25 June 1966, the single entered the Billboard Hot 100 chart and on 30 July 1966, it reached number one, where it remained for two weeks. In Canada, the single (Fontana 1548) reached number two on the RPM magazine charts on 8 August 1966.

Charts

Other versions
The Jimi Hendrix Experience gave a dramatic performance of the song, at the Monterey Pop Festival in 1967: in the documentary Monterey Pop, Jimi Hendrix set his guitar on fire at the song's conclusion. Live recordings by Hendrix are found on several albums; more recently, the Monterey version is included on Voodoo Child: The Jimi Hendrix Collection (2001) and Live at Monterey (2007).

Also in 1967, the novelty team of Senator Bobby released a version of Wild Thing. Comedian Bill Minkin sang it in the verbal style of Democratic Senator Bobby Kennedy, while a recording engineer is heard giving instructions. The single reached number 20 on the Billboard Hot 100. On the flip side, Minkin performs Wild Thing in an impression of Republican US Senator Everett Dirksen.

Fancy, a 1970s pop group made up of session musicians produced by Mike Hurst, recorded the song. Described as a "deeply lascivious version.. with all the heavy breathing and suggestive orgasmic guitar and bass work", they were unable to release the song as a single in their native UK.  In 1974, Big Tree Records issued it on a single in the US, where it reached number 14 and was certified Gold.  It also peaked at number 31 in Australia.

In 1981, Siouxsie Sioux recorded the song with her second band the Creatures, adding new lyrics: "Wild thing, I think I hate you/but I wanna know for sure/so come on, hit me hard/I hate you": it was included on the EP Wild Things. It was described by critics as "Perhaps the most striking of those 7,500-odd licensed recordings... on which [her] chilly multitracked vocals are accompanied only by... tribal-sounding drums". David Cheal of the Financial Times  argued that "It’s a version that taps into the earthy, elemental spirit of the song".

In 1984, the band X released a version as a non-album single. The Houston Press included this version as one of their "10 Greatest Versions" of the song.  It was also included on the soundtrack of the feature film Major League as the entrance theme to Charlie Sheen's character Ricky "Wild Thing" Vaughn.  Director David S. Ward said of this version, "I was listening to the recording of 'Wild Thing' — not the original one by the Troggs, but the one by X, and it was such a big sound, it sounded like a thousand people were singing it" and "I thought, this would be really interesting if people got so into this kid, this pitcher, that when he came into the game, they would stand up and sing 'Wild Thing'." Professional wrestlers Atsushi Onita and Jon Moxley also use this version as their entrance themes, with Moxley using it as a tribute to Onita.

In 1988, comedian Sam Kinison recorded a version of the song to close out his stand-up album Have You Seen Me Lately?. The racy video, featuring actress and Playboy model Jessica Hahn got heavy airplay on MTV at the time. The song was nominated for a Grammy Award for best comedy recording.

In 1993, the Australian band Divinyls recorded the song for the film Reckless Kelly. Released as a single, it peaked at No. 39 on the Australian Singles Chart.

References

External links
 

1965 songs
1966 singles
1987 singles
1993 singles
Amanda Lear songs
Atco Records singles
Billboard Hot 100 number-one singles
Cashbox number-one singles
Carrere Records singles
Divinyls songs
Fontana Records singles
Hansa Records singles
The Jimi Hendrix Experience songs
Songs written by Chip Taylor
The Troggs songs
Number-one singles in New Zealand